
Gmina Brzeżno is a rural gmina (administrative district) in Świdwin County, West Pomeranian Voivodeship, in north-western Poland.

Villages
Gmina Brzeżno contains the villages and settlements of Brzeżno, Chomętówko, Chomętowo, Grąbczewo, Grądzkie, Karsibór, Kłącko, Koszanowo, Miłoszewice, Mulite, Pęczerzyno, Pęczerzyński Młyn, Półchleb, Przyrzecze, Rzepczyno, Słonowice, Sonino, Więcław and Wilczkowo.

Neighbouring gminas
Gmina Brzeżno is bordered by the town of Świdwin and by the gminas of Drawsko Pomorskie, Łobez, Ostrowice and Świdwin.

References
Polish official population figures 2006

Brzezno
Świdwin County